Washington Firehouse No. 5, also known as Fire Station No. 5, is a historic fire station in Mobile, Alabama, United States.  The two-story brick Greek Revival building was built in 1851 at a cost of $5,500.  It was  constructed to house the privately run Washington Fire Company.  The building features a Doric distyle-in-antis arrangement at the street level supporting an upper story with jib windows opening onto a cantilevered iron balcony. The building was documented by the Historic American Buildings Survey in 1936 and was added to the National Register of Historic Places on December 22, 1983.

References

Fire stations completed in 1851
Fire stations on the National Register of Historic Places in Alabama
National Register of Historic Places in Mobile, Alabama
Defunct fire stations in Alabama
Buildings and structures in Mobile, Alabama
Greek Revival architecture in Alabama
1851 establishments in Alabama